The North Carolina Open is the North Carolina state open golf tournament, open to both amateurs and PGA professionals. It is organized by the Carolinas section of the PGA of America, and both state opens run by the Carolinas section, the North Carolina Open and the South Carolina Open, are the only ones in the United States that prohibit non-PGA professionals from competing. It has been played annually since 1965 at a variety of courses around the state.

Winners

2022 Eric Williamson
2021 Spencer Oxendine (amateur)
2020 Kelly Mitchum
2019 Ryan Tyndall
2018 Patrick Cover (amateur)
2017 David Kocher (amateur)
2016 David Kocher (amateur)
2015 Justin Tereshko (amateur)
2014 Nathan Stamey
2013 Spencer Lawson (amateur)
2012 Charles Frost
2011 Scott Harvey (amateur)
2010 David Rogers
2009 Steve Isley
2008 Karl Kimball
2007 Marc Matalavage (amateur)
2006 Billy Anderson
2005 Tim Straub
2004 Bob Boyd
2003 Greg Sweatt
2002 David Thore
2001 Stephen Isley
2000 Bob Boyd
1999 Karl Kimball
1998 Gus Ulrich
1997 Rick Morton
1996 Gus Ulrich
1995 Bob Boyd
1994 Randy Fuquay
1993 Jeff Lankford
1992 Randy Fuquay
1991 Chris Tucker
1990 Chris Tucker
1989 Roy Hunter
1988 Rick Morton
1987 Les Stradley
1986 Stuart Taylor
1985 Stuart Taylor
1984 Jack Lewis Jr.
1983 Waddy Stokes
1982 Tim Collins
1981 Thad Daber (amateur)
1980 Jack Lewis Jr.
1979 Jack Lewis Jr.
1978 Tim Collins
1977 Harvie Ward
1976 Terry Wilcox
1975 Sam Adams
1974 Terry Wilcox
1973 Bob Bryant (amateur)
1972 Bob Galloway
1971 Bob Spence
1970 George Smith
1969 Roger Watson
1968 Phil Hatley
1967 Dale Morey (amateur)
1966 Gene Hamm
1965 Billy Harvey (amateur)

External links
PGA of America – Carolinas section
List of winners

Golf in North Carolina
PGA of America sectional tournaments
State Open golf tournaments
Recurring sporting events established in 1965